State Route 604 (SR 604) is an east–west state highway in north central Ohio.

Created in the late 1930s, this primarily rural route traverses the northeastern corner of Ashland County and the northern tier of Wayne County.  State Route 604 passes through one incorporated community along its path, Congress, where it meets SR 539.

Route description

State Route 604 travels through the counties of Ashland and Wayne.  No portion of this state highway is included within the National Highway System, a network of routes deemed most important to the country's economy, mobility and defense.

History
SR 604 was first designated in 1937 along the path through northeastern Ashland County and northern Wayne County that it occupies to this day.  The highway has not experienced any major changes since making its debut.

Major intersections

References

604
Transportation in Ashland County, Ohio
Transportation in Wayne County, Ohio